Luis Fernández Noseret (fl. 1793-1829, Madrid) was a Spanish engraver who studied with Manuel Salvador Carmona at the Real Academia de Bellas Artes de San Fernando.

Works

At the "Royal Company for engraving", he was charged with reproducing the Saint Catalina by Guido Reni, after a drawing by León Bueno (fl. 1790-1810); again, under the direction of Carmona. He is also known for a copy of the Saint Joseph by Alonso Cano, after a drawing by José Camarón and portraits of King Charles II and Father , taken from the paintings by Claudio Coello in the sacristy of the Monasterio de El Escorial.

In 1795, he created the Collection of the Principal Sorties of a Bullfight, after those of Antonio Carnicero. In 1819, he presented some devotional prints to the Academia for approval. They included images of Aloysius Gonzaga, Saint Nicholas, Saint Isidore and Mary of Egypt. 

His last known work was in 1829, when he created illustrations for Meditations on Divine Attributes for Every Day of the Year by Teodoro de Almeida.

References

External links 

Digitalized works in the Biblioteca Digital Hispánica of the Biblioteca Nacional de España

18th-century Spanish artists
19th-century Spanish artists
Spanish engravers
Spanish illustrators